Cavernularia may refer to:
 Cavernularia (lichen), a genus of lichenised ascomycetes in the large family Parmeliaceae
 Cavernularia (cnidarian),  a genus of marine cnidarians in the family Veretillidae